Willie Scott (born May 22, 1947) is an American former professional basketball player. He played in the American Basketball Association for the Dallas Chaparrals during the beginning of the 1969–70 season. Scott scored 13 points in eight career ABA games.

References

1947 births
Living people
Alabama State Hornets basketball players
American men's basketball players
Baltimore Bullets (1963–1973) draft picks
Basketball players from Alabama
Dallas Chaparrals draft picks
Dallas Chaparrals players
Forwards (basketball)
Sportspeople from Gadsden, Alabama